Khagen Das (4 September 1937 – 21 January 2018) was a member of the 14th Lok Sabha of India. He represented the Tripura West constituency of Tripura and was a member of the Communist Party of India (Marxist) (CPI(M)) political party.

External links
 Official biographical sketch in Parliament of India website

References

1937 births
2018 deaths
Communist Party of India (Marxist) politicians from Tripura
India MPs 2004–2009
India MPs 2009–2014
Lok Sabha members from Tripura
People from West Tripura district
People from Agartala
Tripura politicians
India MPs 1999–2004